The Embassy of Azerbaijan in Islamabad is the diplomatic mission of Azerbaijan to Pakistan. It is located at Plot 1D and 1E in Diplomatic Encave II, Islamabad. The embassy is concurrently accredited to Afghanistan.

Azerbaijan and Pakistan established diplomatic relations in June 1992, soon after the former gained independence. The Azerbaijani embassy in Islamabad was established on 24 August 1997.

The current Azerbaijani ambassador to Pakistan is Ali Alizada, appointed in July 2016. Various diplomatic staff are posted at the mission, along with a defense attaché.

See also 
 Azerbaijan–Pakistan relations

References

External links
  

Azerbaijan–Pakistan relations
Azerbaijan
Islamabad